Mazen Hesham (born 29 March 1994 in Cairo) is a professional squash player who represents Egypt. He reached a career-high world ranking of World No. 8 in March 2022

Career overview
Mazen Hesham (sometimes called the Black Falcon) is a young up-and-coming player on the PSA world tour. He first became visible to the squash crowds radar in 2012 when he secured 3rd place in the WSF junior championships in Doha.

After this momentous victory for Mazen he joined the PSA world Tour.
Mazen Hesham secured his first PSA world tour title in March of the same year in the NSC scram series in Kuala Lampur, Malaysia. He went on to help the Egyptian junior national team win the world title at the World junior Team Squash championships in July 2012. He helped the junior national team defend their crown against the second seed Pakistan.

Mazen Hesham went on to win his second PSA title in Hong Kong at the Crocodile Challenge cup in August 2012. He upset the number one seed and defending champion Max Lee in the final 11-13, 6-11, 11-9, 11-4, 11-3.

Mazen Hesham opened his second year as a part of the PSA world tour by winning the U-23 nationals for Egypt. He was crowned the best U-23 player in Egypt to start off 2013.

Mazen Hesham kept his momentum going to win his 3rd PSA world tour title in the West of Ireland Open in March 2013. He beat Steve Finitsis of Australia in 4 sets, in 56 minutes. Mazen had completed 3 World Tour titles and was now rising to prominence in the squash community.
In this momentous year, he managed to take 2 more PSA world tour titles. The first was in May, when he managed to take the CCI international open in India. The second title was at the inaugural Maharashtra state PSA open. Mazen was the fourth seed, but surprised anyone on his way to his 5th PSA title. He won this title with a win over compatriot Zahed Mohamed 11-5, 3-11, 11-7, 4-11, 11-8.

Although 2014 was a bit of a slow year for Mazen Hesham, he had one of his greatest achievements ever. He started out in April with his 6th PSA title in Houston. 

Mazen now became tied for PSA SquashTV’s most watched player. He was tied with “the artist”, Ramy Ashour.

In April 2015, Mazen Hesham returned to defend his title in Houston. He defended his title superbly, beating Stephen Coppinger 3-0 once again in the semi-finals and going on to defeat Adrian Grant of England in the final.  In the same month, Mazen Hesham’s shot in one of his previous tournaments was rated “shot of the month”. He won another shot of the month award for a blinder in the Delaware Investments U.S. Open 2015 in October.

Mazen Hesham was now a very prominent squash player and has been referred to, as Ramy’s apprentice because of his ability to conjure up the most unorthodox yet effective shots.

Mazen Hesham’s first semifinal appearance in a PSA World Series event was in the Qatar Classic 2015. He reached the semi-final after beating another rising start, Ali Farag. He lost out to World #2 Grégory Gaultier, but this was one of his best performances of all time. This victory pushed Mazen Hesham into his highest recorded world ranking of 13.

Mazen Hesham then got injured in the World Championships against Ramy Ashour which took him out of squash for 5 weeks. He had to cancel two of his tournaments.

References

External links 

1994 births
Living people
Egyptian male squash players